Prince Eskandar Mirza (1810–1856) Prince of Persia's Qajar dynasty, was the son of Abbas Mirza and grandson of Fat'h Ali Shah Qajar. He was governor of Khoy and Salmas 1832-1834 and governor of Qazvin 1848-1852. He died at the age of 46, 1856 in Tabriz. He is the ancestor of Eskandari-Qajar family.

Offspring
 Prince Mohammad Taher Mirza
 Prince Kamran Mirza
 Prince Yagob Mirza

See also
 Mohtaram Eskandari

References
 Nava'i, Abdol-hossein (1976). Tarikh-e Azodi.
 Eskandari-Qajar genealogy, Qajar Pages

Qajar princes
1811 births
1856 deaths
19th-century Iranian politicians